Ragnar Widestedt (3 May 1887 – 4 February 1954) was a Swedish stage and film actor, singer, composer and occasional film director.

Selected filmography

 House Slaves (1923)
 Skipper's Love (1931)
 A Night of Love by the Öresund (1931)
 Tired Theodore (1931)
 Lucky Devils (1932)
 Secret Svensson (1933)
 House Slaves (1933)
 Kanske en gentleman (1935)
 The Marriage Game (1935)
 Adventure in Pyjamas (1935)
 The Ghost of Bragehus (1936)
 The Andersson Family (1937)
 Adolf Strongarm (1937)
 Career (1938)
 A Cruise in the Albertina (1938)
 Comrades in Uniform (1938)
 Emilie Högquist (1939)
 Mot nya tider (1939)
 The Three of Us (1940)
 Heroes in Yellow and Blue (1940)
 The Crazy Family (1940)
 Lärarinna på vift (1941)
 How to Tame a Real Man (1941)
 Only a Woman (1941)
Lucky Young Lady (1941)
 The Train Leaves at Nine (1941)
 Life Goes On (1941)
 Tomorrow's Melody (1942)
 It Is My Music (1942)
 Dangerous Ways (1942)
 She Thought It Was Him (1943)
 Gentleman with a Briefcase (1943)
 Mister Collins' Adventure (1943)
 A Girl for Me (1943)
 My People Are Not Yours (1944)
 Between Brothers (1946)

References

Bibliography 
 Freiburg, Jeanne Ellen. Regulatory Bodies: Gendered Visions of the State in German and Swedish Cinema. University of Minnesota, 1994.
 Soila, Tytti. The Cinema of Scandinavia. Wallflower Press, 2005.

External links 
 

1887 births
1954 deaths
Swedish film directors
Swedish male film actors
Swedish male silent film actors
Swedish male stage actors
20th-century Swedish male actors
20th-century Swedish male singers
Swedish male composers
People from Sundsvall Municipality